S. macrophyllus may refer to:

Senecio macrophyllus, a synonym for Ligularia macrophylla
Sicyos macrophyllus, a rare Hawaiian endemic